Żelkowo  is a village in the administrative district of Gmina Główczyce, within Słupsk County, Pomeranian Voivodeship, in northern Poland.

For the history of the region, see History of Pomerania.

The village has a population of 280.

In village church built in the first half of the 19th century. In vicinity of village: Hydro power-station on Łupawa river, built in 1906.

References

Villages in Słupsk County